Coleophora tuberculata is a moth of the family Coleophoridae. It is found in Tibet.

The wingspan is about 14 mm.

References

tuberculata
Moths of Asia